Echidna delicatula, the mottled moray, also known as the fine-speckled moray, is a moray eel (family Muraenidae). It was described by Johann Jakob Kaup in 1856, originally under the genus Poecilophis. It is a marine, tropical eel which is known from the Indo-Pacific, including Sri Lanka, Samoa, and Japan. It inhabits coral reefs.

The mottled moray is a gonochoristic species.

References

delicatula
Taxa named by Johann Jakob Kaup
Fish described in 1856